Udul-kalama of Uruk was the seventh Sumerian ruler in the First Dynasty of Uruk (ca. 26th century BC), according to the Sumerian King List. He was a son of Ur-Nungal and grandson of Gilgamesh. However, unlike his predecessors, he left no other known documents or relics mentioning his name, and he may have been one of several minor kings of Uruk added to the list, who reigned when hegemony was actually held by the first dynasty of Ur.

|-

Sumerian kings
26th-century BC Sumerian kings
Kings of Uruk